was an early Japanese film director, screenwriter, and actor.

Life and career
Tanaka initially trained as a stage actor in the shingeki movement under Kaoru Osanai, but eventually joined the Nikkatsu film studio in 1917. He debuted as a director in 1918 but mostly had to work with shinpa stories, not the shingeki techniques he was used to although two early films, The Living Corpse (Ikeru shikabane) and The Cherry Orchard (Sakura no sono) were based on Tolstoy and Chekhov respectively. Working in parallel with the Pure Film Movement, Tanaka made two films, Kyōya eirimise (1922) and Dokuro no mai (1923), based on his own screenplays, that were highly praised for their cinematic technique. He remained a rather conservative filmmaker and still used oyama (male actors) in female roles, including in his masterpiece Kyōya eirimise, a melodrama about a merchant's destructive love for a geisha. He used actresses for the first time in Dokuro no mai, a story of a monk reminiscing about his youth and early loves.

His career as a director came to an end in 1923 aside from two minor sound films in the 1930s but he also penned screenplays for such directors as Kenji Mizoguchi and Yutaka Abe and concentrated on acting, appearing in films by Tadashi Imai and Shirō Toyoda. In later life, Tanaka was also active as an educator, teaching at the Nihon Eiga Haiyū Gakkō and at Nihon University helping the careers of such actors as Kōji Shima, Isamu Kosugi, and Shin Saburi. He also wrote several books, including a history of shingeki.

Partial filmography
All produced by Nikkatsu unless otherwise noted.
  (March 1918)
  (April 1918)
  (May 1918)
  (Oct. 1918)
  (June 1919)
  (June 1919)
  (Jan. 1922) - new version of 1918 film
  (Dec. 1922)
  (March 1923)
  (May 1932) (produced by Oriental Film)
  (Feb.1933) (produced by Kyōdai Productions)

References

External links 

Japanese film directors
1886 births
1968 deaths
Japanese male actors
Academic staff of Nihon University
Silent film directors
20th-century Japanese screenwriters